Men at Work is a TBS sitcom created by Breckin Meyer, which premiered on May 24, 2012. The series follows four guys; Milo, Gibbs, Tyler, and Neal, as they help each other navigate through relationships, friendship and working together at the same magazine.

Series overview

Episodes

Season 1 (2012)

Season 2 (2013)

Season 3 (2014)

References

External links 

Lists of American sitcom episodes